Benedict Carey (born 3 March 1960) is an American journalist and reporter on medical and science topics for The New York Times.

Biography
Carey was born on 3 March 1960 in San Francisco, and graduated from the University of Colorado with a degree in mathematics in 1983. In 1985 he enrolled in a one-year journalism program at Northwestern University in Evanston, Illinois and in 1987 joined the staff of San Francisco-based medical science magazine Hippocrates.

From 1997 he worked as a freelance journalist in Los Angeles, before securing a position as the health and fitness writer for the Los Angeles Times. A 2002 article on the health effects of drinking eight glasses of water a day won a Missouri Lifestyle Journalism Award.

Since 2004 Carey has worked as a science and medical writer for The New York Times.

He is the author of two science/math adventures for middle-schoolers, one called "Island of the Unknowns;" previously titled "The Unknowns", and "Poison Most Vial".  He has also written a book about learning science titled "How We Learn: The Surprising Truth About When, Where, and Why It Happens."

See also
 Science journalism

References

External links 
Recent and archived news articles by Benedict Carey of The New York Times.
 https://web.archive.org/web/20110202131456/http://benedictjcarey.com/

1960 births
Living people
The New York Times writers
American medical journalists
Medill School of Journalism alumni
University of Colorado alumni
20th-century American journalists
American male journalists
Gerald Loeb Award winners for Images, Graphics, Interactives, and Visuals